Asanterabi Zephaniah Nsilo Swai (1925–1994) was a Tanzanian politician.

From 1952 to 1954 he was assistant warden at the Makerere University. 
From 1958 to 1960 he was general manager, Meru Cooperative Union and was provincial chairman, Tanganyika African National Union (TANU) of the Northern Province.
From 1960 to 1962 he was chairman, TANU Economics and Social Development Committee.
From 1962 to 1967 he was national treasurer TANU.
In 1960 he was appointed member of the Legislative Council.
From 1960 to 1961 he was Minister of Commerce and Industry.
From January to March 1962 he was Minister of Health and Labor.
From July to December 1962 he was Minister without Portfolio and Permanent Representative of Tanzania to the United Nations
From 1962 to 1963 he was Minister of Development Planning Tanganyika.
In 1962 Nelson Mandela was his guest.
From 1964 to 1965 he was Minister of State, President's Office Directorate of Planning.
On  he held a speech before the 1360th meeting of United Nations General Assembly 
From September 1965 to March 1967, he was Minister of Industries, Mineral Resources and Power, 
From March 1967 to June 1967, he was Minister of Economic Affairs and Development Planning and chairman of the National Development Corporation. 
In 1967 he was Minister of East African Affairs.
From 1967 to 1968 he was East African Community Minister for Communications, Research and Social Services and member, East African Legislative Assembly.

References

1925 births
1994 deaths
Tanzanian politicians
Permanent Representatives of Tanzania to the United Nations
People from Kilimanjaro Region
Tanganyika African National Union politicians
Tanzanian Roman Catholics
Tanzanian pan-Africanists